Shawn Lucas Fluharty (born January 5, 1984) is an American politician who has served in the West Virginia House of Delegates from the 3rd district since 2014.

References

Living people
Democratic Party members of the West Virginia House of Delegates
Place of birth missing (living people)
21st-century American politicians
1984 births